The Yahuecas River is a river of Adjuntas, Puerto Rico. This river aids the hydroelectric dams named Yauco I and Yauco II.

See also
List of rivers of Puerto Rico

References

External links
 USGS Hydrologic Unit Map – Caribbean Region (1974)

Rivers of Puerto Rico